Carlos Betancourt may refer to:

Carlos Betancourt (footballer) (born 1957), Venezuelan 1980s forward
Carlos Betancourt (boxer) (born 1959), Puerto Rican middleweight Olympian in 1976
Carlos Betancourt (artist) (born 1966), American multi-disciplinary curator and designer

See also
Carlos Betancur (born 1989), Colombian road racing cyclist